Stirling railway station may refer to:

 Stirling station (NJ Transit), in New Jersey, United States
 Stirling railway station (Scotland) in Stirling, Scotland
 Stirling railway station, Perth in Perth, Western Australia